From 1906 to 1926, the Finnish Swimming Federation did not arrange a dedicated national competition, but spread out the hosting duties of the championship events to multiple clubs.

Diving

Men

Plain 
Competed in Vaasa on 24 July 1909.

Source:

Platform 
Competed in Vaasa on 25 July 1909.

Source:

Springboard 
Competed in Vaasa on 25 July 1909.

Source:

Women

Platform 
Competed in Turku on 1 August 1909.

Source:

Swimming

Men

100 metre freestyle 
Competed in Vaasa on 24 July 1909.

Source:

1000 metre freestyle 
Competed in Vaasa on 24 July 1909.

Source:

200 metre breaststroke 
Competed in Tampere on 22 August 1909.

Source: 

According to official rules, the competition should have been swam off instead of splitting the championship.

100 metre life saving 
Competed in Tampere on 22 August 1909.

Source:

4 × 50 metre freestyle relay 
Competed in Tampere on 22 August 1909.

Source:

Women

100 metre freestyle 
Competed in Turku on 1 August 1909.

Source:

Water polo

Men 
Competed in Turku on 1 August 1909.

Championship was decided by a single match, won by Helsingfors Simsällskap 6–0 (1–0, 5–0).

Source:

Sources

References 

National swimming competitions
National championships in Finland
Swimming competitions in Finland
1909 in Finnish sport
1909 in water sports
Diving competitions in Finland
Water polo competitions